Betzenweiler is a municipality in the Biberach district of Baden-Württemberg, in southwestern Germany.

The  area is between the basin of Federsee and the Bussen, the largest mountain in central Swabia.

The official language is German, but day-to-day conversations by almost all of its inhabitants are in Swabian dialect.

Relative to its size of ca. 713 Betzenweiler has a big industry and more in-commuters than out-commuters.

There are about 15 bigger companies, some with more than 200 employees, and a lot of small ones.

References

Biberach (district)
Württemberg